North Spirit Lake Airport  is located  southeast of the First Nations community of North Spirit Lake, Ontario, Canada.

Airlines and destinations

References

External links

Certified airports in Kenora District